This is a list of members of the 8th Bundestag – the lower house of parliament of the Federal Republic of Germany, whose members were in office from 1976 until 1980.

496 members were elected in the 1976 West German federal election.



Summary 
This summary includes changes in the numbers of the three caucuses (CDU/CSU, SPD, FDP):

Members

A 

 Manfred Abelein, CDU
 Rudi Adams, SPD
 Jochen van Aerssen, CDU
 Conrad Ahlers, SPD (until 7 March 1980)
 Karl Ahrens, SPD
 Heinrich Aigner, CSU
 Siegbert Alber, CDU
 Walter Althammer, CSU
 Max Amling, SPD
 Franz Amrehn, CDU
 Joachim Angermeyer, FDP
 Hans Apel, SPD
 Walter Arendt, SPD
 Gottfried Arnold, CDU
 Hans-Jürgen Augstein, SPD

B 

 Herbert Baack, SPD
 Dietrich Bahner, CDU (from 12 September 1979)
 Egon Bahr, SPD
 Frolinde Balser, SPD (from 14 August 1979)
 Martin Bangemann, FDP
 Hans Bardens, SPD
 Rainer Barzel, CDU
 Hans Batz, SPD
 Gerhart Baum, FDP
 Alfons Bayerl, SPD
 Richard Bayha, CDU
 Walter Becher, CSU
 Helmuth Becker, SPD
 Karl Becker, CDU
 Ursula Benedix, CDU
 Gerold Benz, CDU
 Markus Berger, CDU (from 25 October 1977)
 Lieselotte Berger, CDU
 Urich Berger, CDU
 Johann Christoph Besch, CDU (from 3 July 1979)
 Hermann Biechele, CDU
 Kurt Biedenkopf, CDU
 Alfred Biehle, CSU
 Günter Biermann, SPD
 Rudolf Bindig, SPD
 Philipp von Bismarck, CDU (until 6 September 1979)
 Bertram Blank, SPD (until 23 May 1978)
 Rudolf Blügel, CDU (from 20 July 1979)
 Norbert Blüm, CDU
 Erik Blumenfeld, CDU
 Wilfried Böhm, CDU
 Rolf Böhme, SPD
 Lenelotte von Bothmer, SPD
 Wolfgang Bötsch, CSU
 Hugo Brandt, SPD
 Willy Brandt, SPD
 Gerhard Braun, CDU
 Ferdinand Breidbach, CDU
 Werner Broll, CDU
 Alwin Brück, SPD
 Hans Büchler, SPD
 Peter Büchner, SPD
 Werner Buchstaller, SPD
 Klaus Bühler, CDU
 Reinhard Bühling, SPD
 Andreas von Bülow, SPD
 Albert Burger, CDU
 Hermann Buschfort, SPD
 Bernhard Bußmann, SPD

C 

 Karl Carstens, CDU (until 29 June 1979)
 Manfred Carstens, CDU
 Hugo Collet, SPD
 Franz Josef Conrad, CDU
 Peter Conradi, SPD
 Manfred Coppik, SPD
 Peter Corterier, SPD
 Dieter-Julius Cronenberg, FDP
 Lothar Curdt, SPD
 Herbert Czaja, CDU
 Christa Czempiel, SPD (from 22 January 1979)

D 

 Carl Damm, CDU
 Klaus Daubertshäuser, SPD
 Herta Däubler-Gmelin, SPD
 Klaus Daweke, CDU
 Nils Diederich, SPD
 Klaus von Dohnanyi, SPD
 Werner Dollinger, CSU
 Alfred Dregger, CDU
 Nicolaus Dreyer, CDU
 Ulrich Dübber, SPD
 Hermann Dürr, SPD

E 

 Jürgen Egert, SPD
 Horst Ehmke, SPD
 Herbert Ehrenberg, SPD
 Karl-Arnold Eickmeyer, SPD (from 23 May 1977)
 Elfriede Eilers, SPD
 Norbert Eimer, FDP
 Alfred Emmerlich, SPD
 Wendelin Enders, SPD
 Hans A. Engelhard, FDP
 Matthias Engelsberger, CSU
 Björn Engholm, SPD
 Ludwig Erhard, CDU (until 5 May 1977)
 Benno Erhard, CDU
 Brigitte Erler, SPD
 Leo Ernesti, CDU
 Ferdinand Erpenbeck, CDU (from 10 September 1979)
 Josef Ertl, FDP
 Helmut Esters, SPD
 Hans Evers, CDU
 Carl Ewen, SPD
 Richard Ey, CDU
 Ekkehart Eymer, CDU
 Heinz Eyrich, CDU (until 16 October 1978)

F 

 Wolfgang Feinendegen, CDU
 Ludwig FellerMayer, SPD
 Udo Fiebig, SPD
 Leni Fischer, CDU
 Willi Fischer, SPD
 Gerhard Flämig, SPD
 Katharina Focke, SPD
 Klaus Francke, CDU
 Egon Franke, SPD
 Heinrich Franke, CDU
 Hans Friderichs, FDP (until 8 November 1977)
 Bernhard Friedmann, CDU
 Bruno Friedrich, SPD
 Isidor Früh, CDU
 Karl Fuchs, CSU
 Liselotte Funcke, FDP (until 23 November 1979)

G 

 Georg Gallus, FDP
 Norbert Gansel, SPD
 Klaus Gärtner, FDP
 Hans H. Gattermann, FDP
 Erna-Maria Geier, CDU
 Franz Xaver Geisenhofer, CSU
 Wolfgang von Geldern, CDU
 Hans-Dietrich Genscher, FDP
 Haimo George, CDU
 Paul Gerlach, CSU
 Ludwig Gerstein, CDU
 Johannes Gerster, CDU (from 13 July 1977)
 Friedrich Gerstl, SPD
 Hans Gertzen, SPD
 Manfred Geßner, SPD
 Karl Heinz Gierenstein, CSU
 Eugen Glombig, SPD
 Michael Glos, CSU
 Peter Glotz, SPD (until 16 May 1977)
 Horst Gobrecht, SPD
 Georg Gölter, CDU (until 8 July 1977)
 Johann Baptist Gradl, CDU
 Claus Grobecker, SPD
 Herbert Gruhl, CDU
 Horst Grunenberg, SPD
 Martin Grüner, FDP
 Kurt Gscheidle, SPD

H 

 Dieter Haack, SPD
 Ernst Haar, SPD
 Horst Haase, SPD
 Lothar Haase, CDU
 Fritz Haberl, CSU
 Karl Haehser, SPD
 Hansjörg Häfele, CDU
 Hildegard Hamm-Brücher, FDP
 Hugo Hammans, CDU
 Franz Handlos, CSU
 Karl-Heinz Hansen, SPD
 August Hanz, CDU
 Liesel Hartenstein, SPD
 Klaus Hartmann, CSU
 Albrecht Hasinger, CDU
 Kai-Uwe von Hassel, CDU
 Rudolf Hauck, SPD
 Volker Hauff, SPD
 Alo Hauser, CDU
 Hansheinz Hauser, CDU
 Helmut Haussmann, FDP
 Herbert Helmrich, CDU
 Erich Henke, SPD
 Ottfried Hennig, CDU
 Peter von der Heydt Freiherr von Massenbach, CDU
 Günther Heyenn, SPD
 Paul Hoffacker, CDU
 Klaus-Jürgen Hoffie, FDP
 Peter Wilhelm Höffkes, CSU
 Ingeborg Hoffmann, CDU
 Hajo Hoffmann, SPD
 Karl Hofmann, SPD
 Egon Höhmann, SPD (until 19 January 1979)
 Friedrich Hölscher, FDP
 Uwe Holtz, SPD
 Stefan Höpfinger, CSU
 Hans-Günter Hoppe, FDP
 Erwin Horn, SPD
 Karl-Heinz Hornhues, CDU
 Martin Horstmeier, CDU
 Alex Hösl, CSU (until 20 March 1977)
 Antje Huber, SPD
 Hans Hubrig, CDU
 Gunter Huonker, SPD
 Herbert Hupka, CDU
 Agnes Hürland, CDU
 Heinz Günther Hüsch, CDU
 Hans Graf Huyn, CSU

I 

 Lothar Ibrügger, SPD
 Klaus Immer, SPD

J 

 Richard Jaeger, CSU
 Claus Jäger, CDU
 Friedrich-Adolf Jahn, CDU
 Gerhard Jahn, SPD
 Hans Edgar Jahn, CDU
 Horst Jaunich, SPD
 Philipp Jenninger, CDU
 Uwe Jens, SPD
 Hans-Joachim Jentsch, CDU
 Dionys Jobst, CSU
 Johann Peter Josten, CDU
 Kurt Jung, FDP
 Hans-Jürgen Junghans, SPD
 Horst Jungmann, SPD
 Heinrich Junker, SPD

K 

 Rudolf Kaffka, SPD
 Irmgard Karwatzki, CDU
 Hans Katzer, CDU
 Ignaz Kiechle, CSU
 Kurt Georg Kiesinger, CDU
 Klaus Kirschner, SPD
 Peter Kittelmann, CDU
 Hans Klein, CSU
 Hans Hugo Klein, CDU
 Heinrich Klein, SPD
 Detlef Kleinert, FDP
 Egon Klepsch, CDU
 Hans-Jürgen Klinker, CDU
 Kurt Koblitz, SPD (until 13 October 1979)
 Helmut Kohl, CDU
 Herbert W Köhler, CDU
 Volkmar Köhler, CDU
 Elmar Kolb, CDU (from 10 June 1977)
 Klaus Konrad, SPD
 Gottfried Köster, CDU
 Wilhelm Krampe, CDU
 Konrad Kraske, CDU
 Paul Kratz, SPD
 Rudolf Kraus, CSU
 Reinhold Kreile, CSU
 Volkmar Kretkowski, SPD
 Heinz Kreutzmann, SPD
 Franz Heinrich Krey, CDU
 Horst Krockert, SPD
 Hermann Kroll-Schlüter, CDU
 Ursula Krone-Appuhn, CSU
 Klaus-Dieter Kühbacher, SPD
 Eckart Kuhlwein, SPD
 Max Künstler, CDU (from 11 September 1980)
 Gerhard Kunz, CDU
 Max Kunz, CSU

L 

 Karl-Hans Laermann, FDP
 Karl-Hans Lagershausen, CDU
 Uwe Lambinus, SPD (from 20 May 1977)
 Otto Graf Lambsdorff, FDP
 Egon Lampersbach, CDU
 Heinz Landré, CDU
 Erwin Lange, SPD
 Gerd Langguth, CDU
 Manfred Langner, CDU
 Dieter Lattmann, SPD
 Paul Laufs, CDU
 Lauritz Lauritzen, SPD (until 5 June 1980)
 Georg Leber, SPD
 Albert Leicht, CDU (until 24 October 1977)
 Karl Heinz Lemmrich, CSU
 Hans Lemp, SPD
 Helmut Lenders, SPD
 Carl Otto Lenz, CDU
 Christian Lenzer, CDU
 Renate Lepsius, SPD
 Kurt Leuschner, SPD (from 9 June 1980)
 Karl Liedtke, SPD
 Jürgen Linde, SPD
 Helmut Link, CDU
 Eduard Lintner, CSU
 Lothar Löffler, SPD
 Paul Löher, CDU
 Peter Lorenz, CDU (until 23 Februar 1977)
 Hans August Lücker, CSU
 Manfred Luda, CDU
 Walther Ludewig, FDP
 Rudolf Luster, CDU
 Egon Lutz, SPD

M 

 Erhard Mahne, SPD
 Peter Männing, SPD
 Ursula Männle, CSU (from 4 October 1979)
 Werner Marquardt, SPD
 Manfred Marschall, SPD
 Anke Martiny-Glotz, SPD
 Werner Marx, CDU
 Ingrid Matthäus-Mayer, FDP
 Hans Matthöfer, SPD
 Kurt Mattick, SPD
 Werner Mayhofer, FDP
 Rolf Meinecke, SPD
 Erich Meinike, SPD
 Alfred Meininghaus, SPD
 Erich Mende, CDU
 Heinz Menzel, SPD
 Rolf Merker, FDP (from 20 April 1978)
 Alois Mertes, CDU
 Reinhard Metz, CDU
 Reinhard Meyer zu Bentrup, CDU
 Paul Mikat, CDU
 Karl Miltner, CDU
 Peter Milz, CDU
 Wolfgang Mischnick, FDP
 Helmuth Möhring, SPD
 Jürgen Möllemann, FDP
 Franz Möller, CDU
 Adolf Müller, CDU
 Günther Müller, CSU
 Hans-Werner Müller, CDU
 Heinrich Müller, SPD
 Johannes Müller, CDU
 Richard Müller, SPD
 Rudolf Müller, SPD
 Willi Müller, SPD
 Adolf Müller-Emmert, SPD
 Ernst Müller-Hermann, CDU
 Franz Müntefering, SPD

N 

 Werner Nagel, SPD
 Karl-Heinz Narjes, CDU
 Albert Nehm, SPD (from 13 September 1978)
 Alfred Hubertus Neuhaus, CDU
 Volker Neumann, SPD (from 20 June 1978)
 Paul Neumann, SPD
 Hanna Neumeister, CDU
 Lorenz Niegel, CSU
 Wilhelm Nöbel, SPD
 Franz-Josef Nordlohne, CDU (until 4 September 1979)
 Norbert Nothhelfer, CDU (until 6 June 1977)

O 

 Rainer Offergeld, SPD
 Martin Oldenstädt, CDU (from 11 September 1979)
 Alfred Ollesch, FDP (until 16 April 1978)
 Jan Oostergetelo, SPD

P 

 Doris Pack, CDU
 Johann Paintner, FDP
 Peter Paterna, SPD
 Alfons Pawelczyk, SPD
 Willi Peiter, SPD
 Willfried Penner, SPD
 Heinz Pensky, SPD
 Helwin Peter, SPD
 Walter Peters, FDP (until 8 April 1979)
 Peter Petersen, CDU
 Gerhard O Pfeffermann, CDU
 Anton Pfeifer, CDU
 Gero Pfennig, CDU (from 24 Februar 1977)
 Walter Picard, CDU
 Elmar Pieroth, CDU
 Liselotte Pieser, CDU
 Winfried Pinger, CDU
 Eberhard Pohlmann, CDU
 Walter Polkehn, SPD
 Konrad Porzner, SPD
 Heinz-Jürgen Prangenberg, CDU
 Albert Probst, CSU

R 

 Alois Rainer, CSU
 Heinz Rapp, SPD
 Hermann Rappe, SPD
 Karl Ravens, SPD (until 15 June 1978)
 Wilhelm Rawe, CDU
 Gerhard Reddemann, CDU
 Otto Regenspurger, CSU
 Heinrich Reichold, CSU (from 4 December 1978 until 2 October 1979)
 Stephan Reimers, CDU
 Annemarie Renger, SPD
 Peter Reuschenbach, SPD
 Paula Riede, CDU (from 9 May 1977)
 Erich Riedl, CSU
 Heinz Riesenhuber, CDU
 Burkhard Ritz, CDU
 Helmut Rohde, SPD
 Paul Röhner, CSU
 Klaus Rose, CSU (from 24 March 1977)
 Philip Rosenthal, SPD
 Wolfgang Roth, SPD
 Volker Rühe, CDU
 Hermann Josef Russe, CDU

S 

 Engelbert Sander, SPD (from 26 May 1978)
 Helmut Sauer, CDU
 Franz Sauter, CDU
 Karl-Heinz Saxowski, SPD
 Botho Prinz zu Sayn-Wittgenstein-Hohenstein, CDU
 Hans Georg Schachtschabel, SPD
 Helmut Schäfer, FDP (from 9 November 1977)
 Friedrich Schäfer, SPD
 Harald B Schäfer, SPD
 Günther Schartz, CDU
 Wolfgang Schäuble, CDU
 Albert Schedl, CSU
 Hermann Scheffler, SPD
 Franz Ludwig Schenk Graf von Stauffenberg, CSU
 Martin Schetter, CDU (from 17 October 1978)
 Adolf Scheu, SPD (until 20 December 1978)
 Dieter Schinzel, SPD (from 5 May 1980)
 Friedel Schirmer, SPD
 Georg Schlaga, SPD
 Marie Schlei, SPD
 Ursula Schleicher, CSU
 Eckhard Schleifenbaum, FDP (from 26 November 1979)
 Günter Schluckebier, SPD
 Peter Schmidhuber, CSU (until 6 December 1978)
 Wolfgang Schmidt, SPD (from 9 January 1978)
 Adolf Schmidt, SPD
 Hansheinrich Schmidt, FDP
 Helmut Schmidt, SPD
 Hermann Schmidt, SPD
 Manfred Schmidt, SPD
 Manfred Schmidt, CDU
 Martin Schmidt, SPD
 Hermann Schmitt-Vockenhausen, SPD (until 2 August 1979)
 Hans Peter Schmitz, CDU
 Hans Werner Schmöle, CDU
 Jürgen Schmude, SPD
 Oscar Schneider, CSU
 Andreas von Schoeler, FDP
 Rudolf Schöfberger, SPD
 Heinz Schreiber, SPD
 Diedrich Schröder, CDU
 Gerhard Schröder, CDU
 Horst Schröder, CDU
 Helga Schuchardt, FDP
 Dieter Schulte, CDU
 Manfred Schulte, SPD
 Waldemar Schulze, SPD
 Wolfgang Schwabe, SPD (until 4 January 1978)
 Heinz Schwarz, CDU
 Christian Schwarz-Schilling, CDU
 Carl-Christoph Schweitzer, SPD (from 11 March 1980)
 Olaf Schwencke, SPD
 Wolfgang Schwenk, SPD
 Hermann Schwörer, CDU
 Horst Seefeld, SPD
 Rudolf Seiters, CDU
 Willi-Peter Sick, CDU
 Hellmut Sieglerschmidt, SPD
 Wolfgang Sieler, SPD
 Heide Simonis, SPD
 Hansmartin Simpfendörfer, SPD
 Dietrich Sperling, SPD
 Adolf Freiherr Spies von Büllesheim, CDU
 Karl-Heinz Spilker, CSU
 Hermann Spillecke, SPD (until 5 May 1977)
 Kurt Spitzmüller, FDP
 Dieter Spöri, SPD
 Carl-Dieter Spranger, CSU
 Rudolf Sprung, CDU
 Erwin Stahl, SPD
 Hermann Stahlberg, CDU
 Anton Stark, CDU
 Heinz Starke, CSU
 Reinhold Staudt, SPD (until 11 September 1978)
 Lutz Stavenhagen, CDU
 Ulrich Steger, SPD
 Waltraud Steinhauer, SPD
 Hans Stercken, CDU
 Wilhelm Stöckl, SPD
 Adolf Stockleben, SPD
 Wilhelm Peter Stommel, CDU
 Günter Straßmeir, CDU
 Franz Josef Strauß, CSU (until 29 November 1978)
 Richard Stücklen, CSU
 Hans-Jürgen Stutzer, CDU
 Olaf Sund, SPD (until 17 May 1977)
 Egon Susset, CDU
 Manfred Sybertz, SPD

T 

 Hans-Adolf de Terra, CDU
 Klaus Thüsing, SPD (from 9 May 1977)
 Ferdinand Tillmann, CDU
 Helga Timm, SPD
 Jürgen Todenhöfer, CDU
 Albert Tönjes, SPD (until 25 April 1980)
 Günter Topmann, SPD
 Brigitte Traupe, SPD
 Irma Tübler, CDU

U 

 Reinhard Ueberhorst, SPD
 Hermann Josef Unland, CDU
 Hans-Eberhard Urbaniak, SPD

V 

 Roswitha Verhülsdonk, CDU
 Friedrich Vogel, CDU
 Hans-Jochen Vogel, SPD
 Kurt Vogelsang, SPD
 Wolfgang Vogt, CDU
 Manfred Vohrer, FDP
 Ekkehard Voigt, CSU (from 8 December 1978)
 Karsten Voigt, SPD
 Günter Volmer, CDU
 Josef Vosen, SPD (from 18 October 1979)
 Friedrich Voss, CSU

W 

 Horst Waffenschmidt, CDU
 Theodor Waigel, CSU
 Karl-Heinz Walkhoff, SPD (from 31 December 1978)
 Walter Wallmann, CDU (until 14 June 1977)
 Ernst Waltemathe, SPD
 Rudi Walther, SPD
 Hanna Walz, CDU
 Jürgen Warnke, CSU
 Ludolf von Wartenberg, CDU
 Kurt Wawrzik, CDU
 Hubert Weber, SPD
 Karl Weber, CDU
 Herbert Wehner, SPD
 Willi Weiskirch, CDU
 Gert Weisskirchen, SPD
 Richard von Weizsäcker, CDU
 Friedrich Wendig, FDP
 Martin Wendt, SPD
 Herbert Werner, CDU
 Axel Wernitz, SPD
 Heinz Westphal, SPD
 Helga Wex, CDU
 Bruno Wiefel, SPD
 Werner Wilhelm, SPD
 Waltrud Will-Feld, CDU
 Dorothee Wilms, CDU
 Hermann Wimmer, SPD
 Willy Wimmer, CDU
 Heinrich Windelen, CDU
 Hans-Jürgen Wischnewski, SPD
 Roswitha Wisniewski, CDU
 Hans Wissebach, CDU (from 15 June 1977)
 Matthias Wissmann, CDU
 Hans de With, SPD
 Fritz Wittmann, CSU
 Otto Wittmann, SPD
 Jürgen Wohlrabe, CDU (until 11 September 1979)
 Torsten Wolfgramm, FDP
 Erich Wolfram, SPD
 Manfred Wörner, CDU
 Olaf Baron von Wrangel, CDU
 Lothar Wrede, SPD
 Otto Wulff, CDU
 Richard Wurbs, FDP
 Peter Würtz, SPD
 Peter Kurt Würzbach, CDU
 Kurt Wüster, SPD
 Günther Wuttke, SPD
 Johann Wuwer, SPD

Z 

 Fred Zander, SPD
 Franz Josef Zebisch, SPD
 Gerhard Zeitel, CDU (until 3 September 1980)
 Werner Zeitler, SPD
 Werner Zeyer, CDU (until 10 July 1979)
 Erich Ziegler, CSU
 Friedrich Zimmermann, CSU
 Otto Zink, CDU
 Wolf-Dieter Zumpfort, FDP (from 30 April 1979)
 Werner Zywietz, FDP

See also 

 Politics of Germany
 List of Bundestag Members

08